Parosi is a Pakistani drama serial aired on NTM in 1990. The drama was written by Haseena Moin and directed by Raana Sheikh. It was filmed in Islamabad and Murree. It starred Khalida Riyasat, Marina Khan, Badar Khalil, Ali Ejaz, Saleem Sheikh and Jamal Shah. This was Khalida Riyasat's last drama serial as she died soon after working in this drama and the long play Ab Tum Ja Sakte Ho.

Plot
Parosi tells the story of two sisters. Jahan Ara who is a single parent as her husband left her for a wealthier woman, and Roshan Ara, who is much more mature and composed as compared to her elder sister. They, along with Haryali Bua, come to live in a house they have rented from Shahnawaz, who is a very strict man living with his nephew Arsal. The comedy of errors starts as Jahan makes the life of her landlord miserable. Roshan Ara and Arsal fall in love.

Cast
 Ali Ejaz as Shahnawaz Ali Khan, aka Agha Jani, the landlord; uncle of Arsal
 Khalida Riyasat as Jahan Ara, the middle sister; has a son, Ali, with ex-husband Malik Iqbal
 Marina Khan as Roshan Ara aka Munni, youngest of three sisters; she makes documentary films 
 Badar Khalil as Haryali Begum; maidservant in the sisters' household. 
 Saleem Sheikh as Arsal, nephew (sister's son) of Aga Jani.
 Jamal Shah as Malik Iqbal, Jehan Ara's husband
 Shamim Hilaly as Bari Aapa (Mrs. Asif), elder sister of Roshan Ara and Jehan Ara 
 Humera Syed] as Nani, maternal grandmother of the sisters
 Latif Sheikh as Chodhry Rehmat Ullah
 Parveen Rasheed as Amma, mother of the sisters
 Sikander as Ali, Jehan Ara and Malik Iqbal's son
 Sardar Meer as cook Ali Ejaz

Reception
The drama serial was shot in Murree and Islamabad and was well received by the audiences. It is considered to be one of Haseena Moin's best works. It featured the great actresses Khalida Riyasat and Marina Khan and it was a treat for the viewers to watch both of them perform together. The drama serial has had several reruns on TV and its DVDs are still in demand.

Soundtrack 

Parosi's soundtrack featured two songs. One was a ghazal called Abhi Kuch Din Lagen Ge sung by Mehnaz with poetry by Iftikhar Arif. The second song was called Ga Raha Tha Koi sung by Ali Haider with poetry by Nasir Kazmi. Both were composed by Arshad Mahmood, and are frequently used during the show.

See also
 Network Television Marketing

References

Pakistani drama television series
Urdu-language television shows
Pakistan Television Corporation original programming
Television shows set in Karachi